Britomartis was a Greek goddess of mountains and hunting, who was primarily worshipped on the island of Crete. She was sometimes believed to be an oread, or a mountain nymph, but she was often conflated or syncretized with Artemis and Aphaea, the "invisible" patroness of Aegina. She is also known as Dictynna (Δίκτυννα; derived by Hellenistic writers as from δίκτυα [diktya], "hunting nets").

Many writers have related her to the presumed mother goddess of much earlier Minoan religion; however, there is no evidence from archaeology for this.

In the 16th century, the naming of a character identified with English military prowess as "Britomart" in Edmund Spenser's knightly epic The Faerie Queene (probably just because "Brit" seemed to fit well with "Britain", with "mart" from Mars, the god of war) led to a number of appearances by "Britomart" figures in British art and literature.

Etymology
According to Solinus, the name 'Britomartis' is from a Cretan dialect; he also says that her name means virgo dulcis, or "sweet virgin". Solinus also identifies her explicitly as the Cretan Artemis. Hesychius of Alexandria also equates the Cretan word βριτύ (britý) with Greek γλυκύ (glyký) 'sweet'. Other scholars have argued that Britomartis ("sweet maid") is an epithet that does not reveal the goddess's name, nor her character, instead arguing that it may be an noa-name.

Mythology
The goddess was frequently portrayed on Cretan coinage, either as herself or as Diktynna, the goddess of Mount Dikte, Zeus' birthplace. As Diktynna, she was depicted as a winged goddess with a human face, standing atop her ancient mountain, grasping an animal in each hand, in the guise of Potnia Theron,  the mistress of animals.

By Hellenistic and Roman times, Britomartis was given a genealogical setting that cast her into a Classical context:

Britomartis, who is also called Dictynna, the myths relate, was born at Caeno in Crete of Zeus and  Carmê, the daughter of Eubulus who was the son of Demeter; she invented the nets (dictya) which are used in hunting.

The third hymn to Artemis by Callimachus tells how she was pursued by Minos and, as Diktynna, "Lady of the Nets", threw herself into fishermen's nets to escape him; thus rescued, she was taken by the fishermen to mainland Greece. She was also known as Dicte.  This myth element "explains" the spread of the Cretan goddess's cult to Greece. Diodorus Siculus found it less than credible:

But those men who tell the tale that she has been named Dictynna because she fled into some fishermen's nets when she was pursued by Minos, who would have ravished her, have missed the truth; for it is not a probable story that the goddess should ever have got into so helpless a state that she would have required the aid that men can give, being as she is the daughter of the greatest one of the gods.

Strabo notes she was venerated as Diktynna only in western Crete, in the region of Cydonia, where there was a Diktynnaion, or temple of Diktynna.  "Oupis [Artemis], O queen, fairfaced Bringer of Light, thee too the Kretans name after that Nymph," Callimachus says.  "She passed her time in the company of Artemis, this being the reason why some men think Diktynna and Artemis are one and the same goddess," Diodorus Siculus (5.76.3) suggested.  

In the second century CE, the Greek writer Pausanias describes Britomartis saying, "She was made a goddess by Artemis, and she is worshipped, not only by the Cretans, but also by the Aiginetans."

Antoninus Liberalis wrote that after escaping Minos, she arrived at Aegina, but a local fisherman named Andromedes tried to lay hands on her, so she jumped off her boat, and became known as Aphaea, a local Aeginetan goddess, whose name Antoninus interprets as 'she who disappeared'. In Britomartis's place, a statue appeared in a temple of Artemis in Aegina.

As Diktynna 
A xoanon, a wooden cult statue, of Britomartis, allegedly carved by Daedalus, sat in the temple of Olous. In Chersonesos and Olous, she was often portrayed on coins, showing that she was worshipped in those cities; the festival Britomarpeia was held in her honor.  As Diktynna, her face was pictured on Cretan coins of Kydonia, Polyrrhenia and Phalasarna as the nurse of Zeus.  On Crete, she was connected with the mountain where Zeus was said to have been born—Mount Dikte.  On some early Britomartis coins of Kydonia, the coin was manufactured as an overstrike of specimens manufactured by Aegina.

Temples dedicated to her existed in Athens, Sparta, Massalia and between Ambrosus and Anticyra in Phocis, where, as Artemis Diktynna, her cult object was a black stone worked by Aeginetans, but she was primarily a goddess of local importance in Western Crete, such as Lysos and West of Kydonia.  Her temples were said to be guarded by vicious dogs stronger than bears. A temple dedicated to the goddess was erected in ancient times on Mount Tityros near Cydonia. Another name, Pipituna, found on Linear B may be another form of Diktynna.

As Aphaea 
Britomartis was worshipped as Aphaea primarily on the island of Aegina, where the temple "Athena Aphaea" stood. A temple dedicated to her also existed at the Aspropyrgos on the outskirts of Athens.

Spenser's "Britomart" 

Britomart figures in Edmund Spenser's knightly epic The Faerie Queene, where she is an allegorical figure of the virgin Knight of Chastity, representing English virtue—in particular, English military power—through a folk etymology that associated Brit-, as in Briton, with Martis, here thought of as "of Mars", the Roman war god. In Spenser's allegory, Britomart connotes the Virgin Queen, Elizabeth I of England.

In his retelling of the King Arthur legends, Arthur Rex, author Thomas Berger suggests that Queen Guinevere may have become a powerful female knight known as Britomart after the death of the King.

See also
HMS Britomart, the name of several Royal Navy ships named after the goddess.

Notes

References 
 Diodorus Siculus, Library of History, Volume III: Books 4.59-8. Translated by C. H. Oldfather. Loeb Classical Library No. 340. Cambridge, Massachusetts: Harvard University Press, 1939. . Online version by Bill Thayer
 Pausanias, Pausanias Description of Greece with an English Translation by W.H.S. Jones, Litt.D., and H.A. Ormerod, M.A., in 4 Volumes. Cambridge, Massachusetts, Harvard University Press; London, William Heinemann Ltd. 1918. Online version at the Perseus Digital Library.

External links 

Oreads
Nymphs
Hunting goddesses
Greek virgin goddesses
Children of Zeus
Demigods in classical mythology
Cretan characters in Greek mythology
Deeds of Artemis
Minoan religion
Metamorphoses into inanimate objects in Greek mythology